Special Events (formerly Arena) is the southernmost station in the Buffalo Metro Rail system located at the corner of Main and Perry Streets in the Free Fare Zone, which allows passengers free travel between Erie Canal Harbor station and Fountain Plaza station. Passengers continuing northbound past Fountain Plaza are required to have proof-of-payment. Special Events station is located next to the KeyBank Center, which it serves immediately before and after an event. If there is no event at KeyBank Center, Erie Canal Harbor station serves as the southern terminus. The tracks continue to the NFTA Rail Maintenance Yard.

In 2023, this station is planned to be replaced by DL&W station.

Notable places nearby
KeyBank Center (formerly First Niagara Center, HSBC Arena, Marine Midland Arena and Crossroads Arena)
Buffalo and Erie County Naval & Military Park
LECOM Harborcenter
NFTA Rail Maintenance Yard

See also
List of Buffalo Metro Rail stations

References

Buffalo Metro Rail stations
Railway stations in the United States opened in 1985